Al Hussein Park is a public park in Amman, Jordan that continues to be under construction. The project attempts to create a landmark for the city by including a cultural village, sports fields, memorial building, historical passageway, decorated gardens, amphitheater, circular yard, Royal Automobile Museum, King Hussein Mosque and The Children's Museum Jordan.

Decorated Garden
Sections of the garden include water elements, plants and trees, Mastabas of various heights, arbors, sand hills, gardens, and sites representing historical periods. It was constructed by Engineering Universe for Building and Contracting and completed in 2006.

The Cultural Village is a square surrounded by Jordanian handicraft shops. Its goal is to introduce Jordan's cultural heritage to Jordanians and visitors alike.

Certain historical events mark each section. The mural was made using natural elements, such as marble, granite, iron, bronze, ceramic tile and pottery.

The Circular Yard is a decorated patio area that is mostly used for events and festivities.

Facilities for football, basketball, volleyball, and tennis are available in the sports area. Also in the area is a camping area and stone bleachers that can hold 150 spectators. They were built by Engineering Universe for Building and Contracting.

References

External links
Al Hussein Public Parks, Amman city website

Buildings and structures in Amman
Jordanian art
Tourist attractions in Amman
Parks in Jordan